Russia selected their Junior Eurovision Song Contest 2014 entry through an internal selection. On 22 September 2014 it was revealed that Alisa Kozhikina would represent Russia in the contest. On 24 September 2014, it was announced that the name of her song would be "Dreamer".

Before Junior Eurovision
On 22 September 2014, it was revealed that 11-year-old Alisa Kozhikina would represent Russia with the song "Dreamer". Kozhikina is the winner of "Golos. Deti", the Russian version the international The Voice Kids format. The song was released on 29 September 2014 via the junioreurovision.tv website. The song is sung in Russian, with the final chorus being in English. The song was composed by Maxim Fadeev, the lyrics were written by Kozhikina herself along with Olga Seryabkina, who represented Russia in the Eurovision Song Contest 2007 as part of girl-band Serebro.

At Junior Eurovision 
At the running order draw which took place on 9 November 2014, Russia were drawn to perform thirteenth on 15 November 2014, following  and preceding .

Voting

Detailed voting results
The following members comprised the Russian jury:
 Oksana Fedorova
 Julia Nachalova
 Yury Entin
 Margarita Sukhankina
 Nikita Presniakov

Notes

References

Junior Eurovision Song Contest
Russia
2014